Clepsimacha is a genus of moths in the family Gelechiidae. It contains the species Clepsimacha eriocrossa, which is found in Taiwan.

References

Anacampsinae